The 1961 Diamond "D" Championship was the first official Canadian women's curling championship. It was held from February 27 to March 3, 1961 at the Ottawa Hunt and Golf Club in Ottawa, Ontario. The format was a round robin, which was the same format used for the Macdonald Brier. All games in the round robin were 10 ends in length with any tiebreaker playoff games being 12 ends in length.

Team Saskatchean, who was skipped by Joyce McKee won the inaugural event by finishing round robin play unbeaten with a 9-0 record. This would be the first of five national championships won by McKee.

Alberta, British Columbia, and New Brunswick finished round robin play tied for second with 6-3 records, necessitating a tiebreaker playoff between the three teams to determine the runner-up. Alberta beat British Columbia 10-9 in the first tiebreaker game. New Brunswick would capture the runner-up spot by defeating Alberta in the second tiebreaker playoff game 13-6.

Teams
The teams are listed as follows:

Round robin standings

Round robin results
All draw times are listed in Eastern  Time (UTC-05:00)

Draw 1
Monday, February 27 9:00 AM

Draw 2
Monday, February 27 8:00 PM

Draw 3
Tuesday, February 28 9:00 AM

Draw 4
Tuesday, February 28 2:00 PM

Draw 5
Wednesday, March 1 12:30 PM

Draw 6
Wednesday, March 1 8:00 PM

Draw 7
Thursday, March 2 9:00 AM

Draw 8
Thursday, March 2 2:00 PM

Draw 9
Thursday, March 2 8:00 PM

Playoff

Tiebreaker #1
Friday, March 3 10:30 AM

Tiebreaker #2
Friday, March 3 1:00 PM

References

1961 in Ontario
Scotties Tournament of Hearts
Diamond D Championship
Curling in Ottawa
Diamond D Championship
Diamond D Championship
Diamond D Championship
Diamond D Championship